Events in the year 2020 in Iceland.

Incumbents
 President: Guðni Th. Jóhannesson
 Prime Minister: Katrín Jakobsdóttir

Events

9 February – Hildur Guðnadóttir became the first Icelander to win an Academy Award.
28 February – The first case of COVID-19 in the country was confirmed.
13 March – A ban on public gatherings in response to COVID-19 was announced.
17 March – The first death from COVID-19 on the island was confirmed; the patient was an Australian tourist.
27 May – End of voting in the 2020 Icelandic presidential election.

Predicted and scheduled events
12 December – 33rd European Film Awards.
Estimated completion of the Dýrafjarðargöng.

Deaths

See also

References 

 
Iceland